Stirellus is a genus of leafhoppers belonging to the family Cicadellidae.

Species
Recognized species of Stirellus include:

 Stirellus affinis
 Stirellus atropuncta
 Stirellus beameri
 Stirellus bicolor
 Stirellus convexus
 Stirellus curtipenis
 Stirellus dixianus
 Stirellus fasciata
 Stirellus flavovirescens
 Stirellus fraterna
 Stirellus illustrata
 Stirellus labiata
 Stirellus mexicanus
 Stirellus mitis
 Stirellus nigripectus
 Stirellus obrienorum
 Stirellus osborni
 Stirellus peshawarensis
 Stirellus picinus
 Stirellus sagittaria
 Stirellus samoanus
 Stirellus subnubilus
 Stirellus tauensis
 Stirellus thattaensis
 Stirellus torresi
 Stirellus vana

References

Cicadellidae genera
Deltocephalinae